Hawkley Hall was a mansion house in Pemberton, about 1.5 miles from Wigan and to the east of Goose Green.
The hall was demolished in 1970 and a housing estate occupies the site today known as the "Hawkley Hall Estate".

Education
Hawkley Hall estate has one school, Hawkley Hall High School. It is a fairly large school that was graded "Outstanding" overall in 2009.

References

Houses in Greater Manchester
Buildings and structures in the Metropolitan Borough of Wigan
Buildings and structures demolished in 1970